Andrés García-Peña is a Colombian-American noted expressionist painter living and working in New York City. His paintings revolve around scenes of Colombian cultural heritage. Andrés García-Peña started his career in New York City as a muralist and prominent figure in the East Village, Manhattan art scene of the 1980s. Since then he has lived and worked in Barcelona. He currently keeps his studio in Brooklyn.

World-renowned as the "Central Park Gondolier" García-Peña has exhibited internationally, with solo shows in Mexico, Colombia, Holland, Spain, Sweden and throughout the United States. He continues to work extensively in public art and has recently completed commissions for the Children's Aid Society in New York City. He has worked extensively on paintings depicting the theme of bullfighting from the bull's point of view.

External links
 Artist Homepage
 BBC video profile on Andrés García-Peña

Living people
20th-century American painters
American male painters
21st-century American painters
American muralists
1961 births
20th-century American male artists